P.K. and the Kid (also known as Petaluma Pride) is a 1987 American drama film  directed  by Lou Lombardo and  starring Paul Le Mat, Molly Ringwald, Alex Rocco, Charles Hallahan and Fionnula Flanagan. Filmed in 1983 but shelved for four years, it was eventually released in  1987.

Plot

P.K. runs away from home because her step-father keeps on harassing her sexually and her mother is ignoring the problem. She hides in the loading space of Kid Kane's pickup, who's on the way to the world championships in arm-pressing. When he discovers her, he wants to send her home at first, but after he knows the story he takes her with him - and gets himself into big trouble: her step-father is behind them furiously, trying to kidnap her and take revenge for the stress he got from her mother.

Cast
Paul Le Mat as Kid Kane 
Molly Ringwald as P.K.
Alex Rocco as Les
Charles Hallahan as Bazooka
 John DiSanti as Benny
Fionnula Flanagan as Flo
Bert Remsen as Al
Leigh Hamilton as Louise
John Madden as himself
John Matuszak as himself
Esther Rolle as Mim
 Charlene as Dolly
 Robert Wentz as Billy
George Fisher as Scratch
Gene LeBell as Big Mac 
Mike Adams as Ernie

Production
Parts of the film were shot in Utah as well as Glenwood Springs, Colorado, Monterey, Petaluma, and San Francisco, California.

References

External links

1987 films
1987 drama films
American drama films
Films scored by James Horner
Warner Bros. films
Films shot in Utah
Films shot in Colorado
Films shot in California
1980s English-language films
1980s American films